The  is a lighthouse located at the northernmost extremity of the Shimokita Peninsula of Honshū island in Ōma, Aomori Prefecture, Japan. It is maintained by the Japan Coast Guard.

The lighthouse is located on a small offshore island called Bentenjima, 600 meters off Cape Ōmazaki, within the borders of the Shimokita Hantō Quasi-National Park. There is no public access.

The Ōmazaki Lighthouse illuminates the Tsugaru Strait at the entrance to Mutsu Bay. This is the narrowest point on the Tsugaru Strait and the light from this lighthouse can be seen across the strait in Hokkaido.

History
Work began on the Ōmazaki Lighthouse in September 1920, and it was first lit on November 1, 1921. During World War II, it was repeatedly hit by air strikes by United States Navy aircraft. By 1945 it laid in ruins.

While being rebuilt after the war, it was once again severely damaged by the 1952 Hokkaido earthquake. The second generation lighthouse was completed in July 1953. A radar beacon was established on April 17, 1983. Since April 1, 1993, the lighthouse has been fully automated, and is now unmanned. The lighthouse is maintained by the Japan Coast Guard.

It is listed as one of the “50 Lighthouses of Japan” by the Japan Lighthouse Association.

See also

 List of lighthouses in Japan

References

External links
 
 Lighthouses in Japan  
 Lighthouse Japan.com

Lighthouses completed in 1921
Lighthouses completed in 1953
Buildings and structures in Aomori Prefecture
Lighthouses in Japan
Ōma
Buildings and structures completed in 1921
Buildings and structures completed in 1953